Stephen James Price (born 30 March 1979) is a former English cricketer. Price was a right-handed batsman who bowled right-arm off break. He was born at Shrewsbury, Shropshire.

Price made his Minor Counties Championship for Herefordshire against Dorset in 1995. From 1995 to 1999, he represented the county in 22 Championship matches, the last of which came against Cornwall. In 1998, he made his MCCA Knockout Trophy debut for the county against Wiltshire. From 1998 to 1999, he represented the county in 6 Trophy matches, the last of which came against the Worcestershire Cricket Board. In 1998, he made his debut in List A cricket for the county against Middlesex in the 1998 NatWest Trophy. In the following season's competition, he played 2 further List A matches for the county against Wiltshire and Yorkshire.

Later, in 2001, he represented the Middlesex Cricket Board in List A cricket. His debut in that format for the Board came against Berkshire in the 2001 Cheltenham & Gloucester Trophy. From 2001 to 2002, he represented the Board in 4 List A matches, the last of which came against Cambridgeshire in the 2nd round of the 2003 Cheltenham & Gloucester Trophy which was held in 2002. In his career total of 7 List A matches, he scored 134 runs at a batting average of 22.33, with a single half century high score of 85. In the field he took a single catch.

References

4. https://www.cricketarchive.co.uk/Middlesex/Players/6/6970/all_teams.html

External links
Stephen Price at Cricinfo
Stephen Price at CricketArchive
Stephen Price Interview at Psychologies Magazine
Stephen Price Personal Best Trainer Award at Tatler magazine 
SP&Co and BodySPace Gym Awards at Tatler magazine
SP&Co Award for best Boutique Gym at Pure Package  
SP&Co New Concept at Leisure Management
by Stephen Price at GQ magazine
Stephen Price at GQ Magazine
Stephen Price at SP&Co at GQ Magazine 
Stephen Price Sunday Times Style Magazine

Stephen Price Q&A Sunday times Style Magazine
Stephen Price SP&Co at Spa Business Magazine  
Stephen Price SP&Co Professional Beauty 
Stephen price SP&Co Leisure Management
Stephen Price SP&Co Cosmetics Business 
Stephen price SP&Co Financial Times - How to Spend it 
BodySPace by SP&Co Metro Newspaper 
Stephen Price SP&Co and BodySPace Spears Wealth Magazine 
Stephen Price Boat International 
Stephen price SP&Co and BodySPace Walpole Magazine
BodySPace The Resident Magazine  
Stephen Price The Daily Telegraph
Stephen Price BodySPace Elite Traveler
Stephen Price Espa Life Gentleman's Journal
Stephen Price and SP&Co at LUX Travel Daily News international 
Stephen Price BodySPace Tatler Magazine
Stephen Price BodySPace Tatler Magazine
Best Retreats Stephen Price SP&Co Tatler Magazine 
Stephen Price SP&Co Vogue magazine 
Stephen Price SP&Co and BodySPace Sports Management  

1979 births
Living people
Sportspeople from Shrewsbury
English cricketers
Herefordshire cricketers
Middlesex Cricket Board cricketers
[[Category: Worcestershire CCC cricketers))